The Saint Spyridon Church is a Serbian Orthodox church in Peroj, Istria, Croatia. The permission to build an Eastern Orthodox church in Peroj was granted by the Republic of Venice in 1788, 130 years after the initial settlement of the local Orthodox community. The church in its current form was completed in 1834.

See also
List of Serbian Orthodox churches in Croatia

References

Serbian Orthodox church buildings in Croatia
Churches completed in 1788
18th-century Serbian Orthodox church buildings
Buildings and structures in Istria County
Former Roman Catholic church buildings
1788 establishments in the Republic of Venice
18th-century churches in Croatia